Thaer Sami Krouma (born 2 February 1990) is a Syrian footballer who plays.

Club career 
On 3 January 2018, Krouma moved to Lebanese Premier League side Ansar on a six-year contract.

On 21 August 2022, Krouma joined Saudi Arabian club Al-Ain.

References

External links
 Career Thaer Krouma at Goalzz
 Thaer Krouma at Soccerway
 Thaer Kroma at NFT

1990 births
Living people
Syrian footballers
Sportspeople from Homs
Association football midfielders
Syria international footballers
Al-Talaba SC players
Al-Shorta Damascus players
Al Ansar FC players
Al-Ain FC (Saudi Arabia) players
Syrian Premier League players
Lebanese Premier League players
Saudi First Division League players
Syrian expatriate footballers
Expatriate footballers in Iraq
Syrian expatriate sportspeople in Iraq
Expatriate footballers in Lebanon
Syrian expatriate sportspeople in Lebanon
Expatriate footballers in Saudi Arabia
Syrian expatriate sportspeople in Saudi Arabia